Pietrzak is a Polish surname, it may refer to:
 Bogusław Pietrzak, Polish football manager
 Henryk Pietrzak (1914–1990), Polish fighter ace
 Jan Pietrzak (born 1937), Polish comedian
 Jim Pietrzak (1953–2018), American football player
 Konstantin Petrzhak (1907–1998), Soviet physicist of Polish origin
 Łucja Pietrzak (born 1995), Polish cyclist
 Michał Pietrzak (born 1989), Polish athlete
 Rafał Pietrzak (born 1992), Polish footballer
 Włodzimierz Pietrzak (1913–1944), Polish poet

Polish-language surnames
Patronymic surnames